Sher Shah Junction railway station (Urdu and ) is located in Sher Shah village, Multan district of Punjab province, Pakistan.

See also
 List of railway stations in Pakistan
 Pakistan Railways

References

External links

Railway stations in Multan District
Railway stations on Sher Shah–Kot Addu Branch Line
Railway stations on Karachi–Peshawar Line (ML 1)